Dr. Yaba Blay is a Ghanaian-American professor, scholar-activist, public speaker, cultural worker, and consultant. She is originally from Ghana, West Africa, and was raised in New Orleans, Louisiana, United States. Her scholarship, work, and practice centers on the lived experiences of Black women and girls, with a particular focus on identity politics and beauty practices. Lauded by O Magazine for her social media activism, she has launched several viral campaigns, including Locks of Love, #PrettyPeriod, and #ProfessionalBlackGirl, in her multi-platform digital community.

In 2012, Dr. Blay served as a producer on CNN's television documentary, “Who is Black in America?". She has since been named one of today's leading Black voices by ‘The Root 100’, and Essence Magazine's ‘Woke 100.’ She has appeared on Good Morning America, CNN, BET, MSNBC, BBC, and NPR. Her work has also been featured in The New York Times, EBONY, Essence, Fast Company, The Philadelphia Inquirer, ColorLines, and The Root, to name a few. Her commentary is featured in A Changing America: 1968 and Beyond, a permanent installation exhibited in the National Museum of African American History and Culture. Blay is the author of the award-winning One Drop: Shifting the Lens on Race.

Education 
Blay was born and raised in New Orleans, US, where her Ghanaian parents had relocated. She received her B.A. in psychology (cum laude) from Salisbury State University, M.Ed. in counseling psychology from the University of New Orleans, and M.A. and Ph.D. in African American studies from Temple University with a Graduate Certificate in women's studies. The former Dan Blue Endowed Chair in Political Science at North Carolina Central University, she has also taught on the faculties of Lehigh University, Lafayette College, and Drexel University, where she served as the director of the Africana Studies program.

Career 
Blay is the author of One Drop: Shifting the Lens on Race and artistic director of the One Drop project. In One Drop, she explores the interconnected nuances of skin color politics and racial identity, and challenges perceptions of blackness as both an identity and lived reality. In 2012, she served as a consulting producer for CNN Black in America – Who is Black in America? – a television documentary inspired by the scope of her One Drop project. In addition to her production work for CNN, Blay is producing a transmedia film project focused on the global practice of skin bleaching (with director Terence Nance).

While her broader research interests are related to African cultural aesthetics, aesthetic practices, and global Black popular culture, Blay's specific research interests lie within global black identities and the politics of embodiment, with particular attention given to hair and skin color politics. Her 2007 dissertation, "Yellow Fever: Skin Bleaching and the Politics of Skin Color in Ghana", relies upon African-centered and African feminist methodologies to investigate the social practice of skin bleaching in Ghana. Her ethnographic case study of skin color and identity in New Orleans, entitled "Pretty Color and Good Hair", is featured as a chapter in the anthology Blackberries and Redbones: Critical Articulations of Black Hair/Body Politics in Africana Communities.

Research and selected writings 
Research
 One Drop: Shifting the Lens on Race, 2013. 
 "Yellow Fever: Skin Bleaching and the Politics of Skin Color in Ghana"
 "Pretty Color and Good Hair"

Selected writings
 "White Supremacist would be Black under America’s One-Drop Rule"
 "Tell a Brown Girl She’s Pretty, Dreadlocks and all"
 "Color Me Beautiful: A Dark Girl Reflects on 'Dark Girls'"
 "Soledad O’Brien: Who is Black in America? I Am"
 “Who’s Black, Who’s Not, and Who Cares?”
 “One Drop”
 Journal of Pan African Studies (vol. 4, no. 4) [Guest Editor]
 “Editorial: Skin Bleaching and Global White Supremacy”
 Jenda: A Journal of Culture and African Women Studies (no. 14) [Guest Editor]
 “’Ahɔɔfe Kasa!’: Skin Bleaching and the Function of Beauty among Ghanaian Women”
 “All the ‘Africans’ are Men, all the ‘Sistas’ are ‘American,’ but Some of Us Resist…”
 “Asamando” 
 “Color Symbolism”
 “Cromanti”

Bibliography
Encyclopedia of African Religions, Dr. Molefi K. Asante - July 2011

References

External links
 Dr Yaba Blay website
 "Yaba Blay, Ph.D.", The Daniel T. Blue Endowed Chair, North Carolina Central University
 "Imagine Otherwise: Yaba Blay on Everyday Black Girl Magic", December 13, 2017.
 

Living people
1974 births
North Carolina Central University faculty
African-American women academics
American women academics
African-American academics